"Libre" is a song by Spanish singer-songwriter Álvaro Soler. It was written by Soler, Ali Zuckowski, Simon Triebel, David Julca, and Jonathan Julca for the international reissue of his debut studio album Eterno Agosto (2015) and features guest vocals from Mexican singer Paty Cantú. Production was handled by Zuckowski and Triebel. The pop song was released as the reissue's second and Eternal Agostos overall fourth single in 2016, with Monika Lewczuk and Emma Marrone providing vocals for the Polish and Italian single releases respectively. Another chart success, it became Soler's fourth consecutive song to top the Polish Airplay Top 100 chart and reached the top thirty of the Italian Singles Chart.

Track listing 
Digital download (Italian Version)
"Libre" (featuring Emma Marrone) – 3:51

Charts

Certifications

References

2016 singles
Spanish-language songs
Álvaro Soler songs
2016 songs
Songs written by Simon Triebel
Number-one singles in Poland
Songs written by Álvaro Soler